Bonita is an extinct town in Douglas County, in the U.S. state of Washington.

A post office called Bonita was established in 1903, and remained in operation until 1927. The community was named after a place in the Philippines, according to local history.

References

Ghost towns in Washington (state)
Geography of Douglas County, Washington